Fredrik Brustad (born 22 June 1989) is a Norwegian football forward who plays for KFUM.

Club career
Brustad was born in Oslo, and played for Ullern and Lyn in his youth. After spending three years of his college soccer career at Stetson University, he signed a contract with the Tippeligaen side Stabæk in August 2011. He made his debut in Tippeligaen in the match against Brann on 21 August 2011. He scored two goals on 29 May 2012 in Stabæk's first win of the season in the match against Lillestrøm, benefitting from his quick pace. Brustad personal record on 40 meter is 4.57 and Stabæk's head coach, Petter Belsvik said; "I would need to have a head start of at least 20 meters to beat him running 40 meters."

Fredrik Brustad signed a three-year pre-contract with AIK starting January 2015. In the summer of 2018 Brustad signed a loan deal with Scottish club Hamilton Academical. The loan was scheduled to run for the whole of the 2018–19 season, but Molde opted to curtail the arrangement in January 2019. On 11 January 2019 Brustad signed for Mjøndalen on a three years contract.

Personal life
Brustad is the half-brother of Norway international footballer Kjetil Wæhler.

Career statistics

References

1989 births
Living people
Footballers from Oslo
Norwegian footballers
Lyn Fotball players
Stetson Hatters men's soccer players
Orlando City U-23 players
Stabæk Fotball players
USL League Two players
Eliteserien players
Norwegian First Division players
AIK Fotboll players
Molde FK players
Allsvenskan players
Norwegian expatriate footballers
Expatriate soccer players in the United States
Expatriate footballers in Sweden
Norwegian expatriate sportspeople in the United States
Norwegian expatriate sportspeople in Sweden
Association football forwards
Norway international footballers
Scottish Professional Football League players